The Flame (French: La flamme) is a 1936 French drama film directed by André Berthomieu and starring Line Noro, Charles Vanel and Gabriel Signoret. It is based on a play by Charles Méré. The story had previously been made into a silent film in 1926.

Cast
 Line Noro as Cléo d'Aubigny  
 Charles Vanel as Victor Boussat  
 Gabriel Signoret as Lord Sidley  
 Josette Day as Hélène de Luyze 
 Bernard Lancret as Edward Sidley  
 Raymond Cordy as Le gaffeur  
 Colette Darfeuil as Fanny 
 Mady Berry as Mme Laure  
 Henri Crémieux as Le détective  
 Paul Demange as Le garçon  
 Blanche Denège as Mme de Luyze  
 Jean Diéner as H. de Luyze  
 Toto Grassin as Le barman  
 Claire Gérard as La nourrice  
 Jean Marconi as Le gigolo  
 Alain Michel as Edward enfant

References

Bibliography 
 Goble, Alan. The Complete Index to Literary Sources in Film. Walter de Gruyter, 1999.

External links 
 

1936 drama films
French drama films
1936 films
1930s French-language films
Films directed by André Berthomieu
French black-and-white films
Remakes of French films
Sound film remakes of silent films
French films based on plays
1930s French films